Boule may refer to:

Ball games
 Boules, a collective term for games involving players throwing balls at a smaller target ball
 Pétanque, a common variety originating in France and sometimes loosely called "boules" in English
 Boule Lyonnaise, another boules game of French origin
 Boule Bretonne, a boules game from Brittany
 Boule (gambling game), a game similar to roulette

People
 Boule (community), an Akan people in Côte d'Ivoire, Africa
 Auguste-Louis-Désiré Boulé (1799–1865), French playwright
 Marcellin Boule (1861–1942), French palaeontologist

Politics
 Boule (ancient Greece), a citizens' council appointed to run daily affairs of a city
 Hellenic Parliament, transliterated as Vouli or Boule from Greek

Science and geography
 Boule (crystal), an ingot of synthetically produced crystal
 Boule (gene), an alias for the gene BOLL, responsible for sperm production in animals
 , one of the Northern Continental Ranges in the Canadian Rocky Mountains

Other uses
 The Boulé, or Sigma Pi Phi fraternity, the oldest fraternity for African Americans named with Greek letters
 Boule (bread), a round loaf of white bread

See also
 Bole (disambiguation)
 Bool (disambiguation)
 Boul (disambiguation)
 Boule et Bill, Belgian comic strip
 Boulle (surname)
 Boully (surname)
 Bowl (disambiguation)